The Royal New Zealand Armoured Corps (RNZAC) is the overall umbrella grouping of Regular Force  and Territorial Force units equipped with armoured vehicles in the New Zealand Army. The corps was formed in 1942 as the New Zealand Armoured Corps, before being given the Royal prefix in 1947. The RNZAC is second in seniority of corps within the New Zealand Army.

The Divisional Cavalry Regiment and the 4th Armoured Brigade were among the foremost NZ armoured units during World War II, though at home the 1st Army Tank Brigade was also established.

Although the RNZAC did not deploy one of its own units to the Vietnam War, from 1965-1971 RNZAC personnel served within other New Zealand and Australian units including artillery, infantry, command and support, and logistics. Several members served as tank crew with the 3rd Cavalry Regiment of the Royal Australian Armoured Corps, and 1st Squadron, 4th Cavalry Regiment (U.S Army.) Two RNZAC pilots served with the Australian 161st (Independent) Reconnaissance Flight.

During the 1990s, corps personnel contributed to the deployment of a mechanized infantry company group to Bosnia-Hercegovina for UNPROFOR as part of the NZDF Operation Radian.

Among the surviving Territorial Force units at the end of the 20th Century was the Wai/WEC Squadron, later the Waikato Mounted Rifles in Hamilton, and the fast-diminishing New Zealand Scottish Regiment, also at squadron size technically but actually dwindling into single figures, in the South Island. The New Zealand Scots were finally disbanded in 2016.

Current units
RNZAC personnel serve in:

Regular Force
Queen Alexandra's Mounted Rifles (QAMR)
Combat School

Territorial Force
4th Waikato Mounted Rifles - Armoured Reconnaissance

Equipment

The RNZAC is primarily equipped with two types of vehicle:
NZLAV - the NZLAV armoured fighting vehicle (AFV) is a variant of the General Dynamics LAV III.
Pinzgauer - the Army's Light Operational Vehicle (LOV) with command and control, general service, and armoured variants.

Alliances
 - The Royal Tank Regiment
 - The King's Royal Hussars
 - The Royal Dragoon Guards

See also
Royal Armoured Corps
Royal Australian Armoured Corps
Royal Canadian Armoured Corps
Tanks of New Zealand

Lineage of units

The units of the Royal New Zealand Armoured Corps have a complicated and intermingled heritage. The following table shows the relationship between units since 1944. Titles in bold denote regiments, while non-bold titles are individual squadrons.

Order of precedence

Further reading
Cooke, Peter; Crawford, John (2011). The Territorials: The History of the Territorial and Volunteer Forces of New Zealand. Auckland: Random House. .
Major G.J. Clayton, The New Zealand Army, A History from the 1840s to the 1990s, New Zealand Army, Wellington, 1990
Damien Marc Fenton, A False Sense of Security?, Centre for Strategic Studies New Zealand

References

Administrative corps of New Zealand
New
Military units and formations established in 1942
Organisations based in New Zealand with royal patronage